Glipostenoda mellissiana is a species of beetle in the genus Glipostenoda. It was described in 1870.

References

mellissiana
Beetles described in 1870